The 2006 Auckland Blackout was a major electrical blackout in Auckland, the largest city in New Zealand, on 12 June 2006. It started at 08:30 local time, with most areas of Auckland regaining power by 14:45 local time.  It affected some 230,000 customers and at least 700,000 people in and around the city.

Immediate effect
Power went off at around 8:30 am local time on 12 June 2006 over half of Auckland in New Zealand. Most of southern and central Auckland, including the central city were without power.

Cause 
The cause of the blackout was traced back to the Otahuhu sub-station, the city's main transmission switching station. A corroded shackle connecting the Otahuhu to Penrose 220 kV line's earth wire had broken in  winds, letting the earth wire fall across the 220 kV line and the 110 kV busbar below it, tripping both the line and three sections of the busbar, disconnecting lines to Mount Roskill, Penrose and Pakuranga. The trip also disconnected Otahuhu B and Southdown power stations from the national grid. The trip left only one line, the now-dismantled Arapuni to Pakuranga 110 kV line, supplying Pakuranga, Penrose, and the central city. Eight seconds after the failure, this line tripped from overloading, leaving Penrose, Pakuranga, and central city substations without power, as well as parts of Otahuhu and Mount Roskill substations.

Investigation of this incident found that maintenance of the electricity transmission system was not adequate and that this substation had major and minor design deficiencies.

Effects
Due to the power outage, many public services and business operations were disrupted:
 suburban commuter railway services were suspended
 over 300 groups of traffic lights were off
 some hospitals were closed and left only emergency services in operations
 radio station transmitters located in the Sky Tower were also taken offline for a period of time
 mobile phone and telephone service failures
 people stuck in lifts in office buildings
 end of semester exams due to be held that day at local universities were postponed.

Since the central city was without power from the morning rush hours, business operations and traffic were disrupted severely. Many businesses sent their staff home.

Restoration of service
Power was restored to Auckland central at 12:40 local time, 12 June 2006. It was estimated that all affected areas would have their power restored by 16:30 local time. At approximately 14:45, power was restored to most of Auckland, except Penrose, Glen Innes, East Tāmaki, and Ōtāhuhu.

Improving security of supply
The incident at Otahuhu in June 2006 had a major influence on subsequent decisions about the development of the grid.

On 11 December 2006, the Electricity Commission (NZ) received an application from Transpower for the establishment of a new 220 kV gas insulated switchgear (GIS) facility at Otahuhu, adjacent to but geographically separate from the existing outdoor 220 kV switchyard.  This project was described as the Otahuhu substation diversity project, and included transferring approximately half of the circuits from the existing switchyard to the new GIS switchyard, to improve network resilience.  The project was approved in August 2007.

Further steps have been taken to increase security of supply to Auckland, by reducing the dependence on Otahuhu.  These include the diversity provided as part of the North Island Grid Upgrade Project by connecting the new Whakamaru to Brownhill Road transmission line to Pakuranga substation, rather than directly to Otahuhu.  A second major project, the North Auckland and Northland grid upgrade project provides underground 220 kV cables from Pakuranga to Penrose, and from Penrose to Albany on the North Shore, via Hobson Street in the Auckland CBD.  A 220 kV- capable overhead transmission line between Pakuranga and Otahuhu has also been upgraded from 110 kV to 220 kV.

See also
1998 Auckland power crisis
List of power outages
Whakamaru to Brownhill Road transmission line
North Auckland and Northland grid upgrade project

References

Power outages in New Zealand
Auckland Blackout, 2006
Auck
Auck
2000s in Auckland
Electric power transmission systems in New Zealand
Auck
June 2006 events in New Zealand